Alhaji Kareem Adepoju  popularly known as "Baba Wande" is a Nigerian film actor, writer and producer who shot to limelight in 1993 after he starred as "Oloye Otun" in the movie titled Ti Oluwa Ni Ile.

Selected filmography

Oluweri Magboojo
Ti Oluwa Ni Ile
Ayọ Ni Mọ Fẹ
Abeni
Arugba
Igbekun
Òbúko Dúdú
Ika lomo ejo
’’Enu Eye(2010)‘’
’’Anikulapo (2022)’’

See also
 List of Nigerian film producers

References

External links
 

Living people
Nigerian male film actors
Nigerian film producers
Yoruba male actors
Male actors in Yoruba cinema
20th-century Nigerian male actors
21st-century Nigerian male actors
Year of birth missing (living people)

Nigerian male television actors